The 1987 Horsham District Council election took place on 7 May 1987 to elect members of Horsham District Council in England. It was held on the same day as other local elections. The Conservatives retained control of the council with 33 seats, a majority of 12. The SDP–Liberal Alliance won 6 seats and Independents won 4.

Council Composition 

Prior to the election, the composition of the council was:

After the election, the composition of the council was:

Results summary

Ward results

Billingshurst

Bramber & Upper Beeding

Broadbridge Heath

Chanctonbury

Cowfold

Denne

Forest

Henfield

Holbrook

Itchingfield & Shipley

Nuthurst

Pulborough & Coldwatham

Riverside

Roffey North

Rudgwick

Rusper

Slinfold

Southwater

Steyning

Storrington

Sullington

Trafalgar

Warnham

West Chiltington

West Grinstead

References

1987 English local elections
May 1987 events in the United Kingdom
1987
1980s in West Sussex